The 2018–19 season is Raja Casablanca's 70th season in existence and the club's 62nd consecutive season in the top flight of Moroccan football. They competing in Botola, the Throne Cup, Confederation Cup, CAF Super Cup and Arab Club Champions Cup.

Squad list
Players and squad numbers last updated on 25 August 2018.Note: Flags indicate national team as has been defined under FIFA eligibility rules. Players may hold more than one non-FIFA nationality.

Competitions

Overview

{| class="wikitable" style="text-align: center"
|-
!rowspan=2|Competition
!colspan=8|Record
!rowspan=2|Started round
!rowspan=2|Final position / round
!rowspan=2|First match
!rowspan=2|Last match
|-
!
!
!
!
!
!
!
!
|-
| Botola

| 
| style="background:silver;"|Runner-up
| 25 August 2018
| 9 June 2019
|-
| Throne Cup

| Round of 32
| Semi-finals
| 2 September 2018
| 3 November 2018
|-
| 2018 CAF Confederation Cup

| Group stage
| style="background:gold;"|Winners
| 18 July 2018
| 2 December 2018
|-
| 2018–19 CAF Confederation Cup

| First round
| Group stage
| 16 December 2018
| 17 March 2019
|-
| CAF Super Cup

| Final
| style="background:gold;"|Winners
| colspan=2|29 March 2019
|-
| Arab Club Champions Cup

| First round
| Quarter-finals
| 10 August 2018
| 8 February 2019
|-
! Total

Botola

League table

Results summary

Result round by round

Matches

Moroccan Throne Cup

2018 Confederation Cup

Group stage

Group A

knockout stage

Quarter-finals

Semi-finals

Final

CAF Super Cup

2018–19 Confederation Cup

First round

Play-off round

Group stage

Group A

Arab Club Champions Cup

First round

Second round

Quarter-finals

Squad information

Playing statistics

|-
! colspan=16 style=background:#dcdcdc; text-align:center| Goalkeepers

|-
! colspan=16 style=background:#dcdcdc; text-align:center| Defenders

|-
! colspan=16 style=background:#dcdcdc; text-align:center| Midfielders

|-
! colspan=16 style=background:#dcdcdc; text-align:center| Forwards

|-
! colspan=16 style=background:#dcdcdc; text-align:center| Players transferred out during the season

Goalscorers
Includes all competitive matches. The list is sorted alphabetically by surname when total goals are equal.

Transfers

In

Out

Notes

References

Raja CA seasons
Raja CA